Will Sanders Heller (born February 28, 1981) is a former American football tight end He was signed as an undrafted free agent by the Tampa Bay Buccaneers in 2003. He played college football at Georgia Tech.

Heller has also played for the Miami Dolphins, Seattle Seahawks, and Detroit Lions.

Early years
Heller attended Marist High School in Atlanta, Georgia, and was a student and a letterman in both football and basketball. In football, he played tight end, wide receiver, and defensive back, and was a 2nd Team All-Northside selection under Marist head football coach Alan Chadwick.

College career
Heller attended Georgia Tech in Atlanta, Georgia, where he played Tight End under Coach George O'Leary. Heller arrived at Georgia Tech as a walk-on candidate for tight end after turning down his only football scholarship offer to Division I-AA Furman.

Professional career

Seattle Seahawks
In 2007, he had two touchdown receptions for the Seahawks against the St. Louis Rams. At the end of the 2007 season he had 13 receptions for 82 receiving yards and 3 touchdowns.

Detroit Lions
Heller was signed by the Detroit Lions on March 16, 2009. He was released following the 2011 season on March 12, 2012, but re-signed on March 22, 2012.

References

External links
Detroit Lions bio
Seattle Seahawks bio

1981 births
Living people
People from Dunwoody, Georgia
American football tight ends
Georgia Tech Yellow Jackets football players
Sportspeople from DeKalb County, Georgia
Tampa Bay Buccaneers players
Miami Dolphins players
Seattle Seahawks players
Detroit Lions players
Marist School (Georgia) alumni